"Long Hot Summer" is a song by the English band The Style Council which was their third single to be released.  It was composed by lead singer Paul Weller, recorded between 12 and 17 June 1983 in the Grande Armée Studios in Paris, and released on 8 August 1983.  In addition to being sold as a conventional two track 7" single, "Long Hot Summer" was also simultaneously released as a four track 7" and 12" EP titled À Paris which also contained the song "The Paris Match" plus two keyboard instrumentals, "Party Chambers" and "Le Depart".  It was also included on the 1983 mini-album Introducing The Style Council.

The promotional video for "Long Hot Summer" was filmed on the River Cam in Cambridge.  The song reached the position of number three in the UK singles chart making it the Style Council's biggest hit, and it remains a staple of Paul Weller's live concerts.

By coincidence the British summer heat wave of 1983, most notably July, turned out to be one of the hottest on record – something that would not have been known at the time the song was written and recorded.

Compilation appearances
As well as the song's single release, the ballad has featured on various compilation albums released by The Style Council. The song was included on The Singular Adventures of The Style Council, The Complete Adventures of The Style Council, and Greatest Hits.

Track listing
 12" single (TSCX3)
"Long Hot Summer" (Extended Version)
"Party Chambers"
"The Paris Match"
"Le Départ"

 7" single (815 276-7)
"Long Hot Summer"
"Le Départ"

Personnel
Credits are adapted from the album's liner notes.
 Paul Weller – lead vocals, guitars
 Mick Talbot – keyboards
 Steve White – drums

Charts

References

External links
/ BBC Heatwave History in Graphics
The British Weather

1983 songs
1983 singles
1980s ballads
The Style Council songs
Songs written by Paul Weller
Pop ballads
Polydor Records singles